Pera Orinis, or Pera Oreinis or Pera ("Orinis" designates the name of the area "Orinis" to distinguish from villages with the same name in other areas), (Greek: Πέρα Ορεινής or Πέρα) is a village in the area known as Tamassos, which is in turn part of the Nicosia District in Cyprus.

Pera is situated near Tamassos dam (built in 2002 ); about one hour walking distance across the Pedhieos river bank.

References

External links
 Website of the Community Council
 tamassos.org - History and culture of the area; list of churches etc. (in Greek and English).
  - small collection of early morning photos of Pera Orinis.

Communities in Nicosia District